Callington is a civil parish and town in east Cornwall, England, United Kingdom about  north of Saltash and  south of Launceston.

Callington parish had a population of 4,783 in 2001, according to the 2001 census. This had increased to 5,786 in the 2011 census.

Geography
The town is situated in east Cornwall between Dartmoor to the east and Bodmin Moor to the west. A former agricultural market town, it lies at the intersection of the south–north A388 Saltash to Launceston road and the east–west A390 Tavistock to Liskeard road.

The hamlets of Bowling Green, Kelly Bray, Frogwell and Downgate are in the parish.

Railway station

Callington railway station was the terminus of a branch line from Bere Alston, the junction with the Southern Railway's Tavistock to Plymouth line. The railway line beyond Gunnislake to the Callington terminus was closed in the 1960s, due to low usage and difficult operating conditions on the final sections of the line due to several severe gradients and speed restrictions. One can still travel by rail on the Tamar Valley Line from Plymouth as far as Gunnislake via Bere Alston, where trains reverse. For most of its journey the line follows the River Tamar. Gunnislake is the nearest railway station to Callington, although the nearest mainline station is at Saltash.

Economy
Food manufacturers  Ginsters and The Cornwall Bakery (both wholly owned subsidiaries of Samworth Brothers) are the largest employers in the town.

Ginsters uses local produce in many of its products, buying potatoes and other vegetables from local farmers and suppliers.

Historic listed building The Old Clink on Tillie St, built in 1851 as a lock-up for drunks and vagrants, is now used as the offices for a local driving school.

There is also a Tesco supermarket, opened in 2010, which employs 200 local people.

History and antiquities

Callington has been postulated as one of the possible locations of the ancient site of Celliwig, associated with King Arthur. Nearby ancient monuments include Castlewitch Henge, with a diameter of 96 m and Cadsonbury Iron Age hillfort, as well as Dupath Well built in 1510 on the site of an ancient sacred spring.

Callington was recorded in the Domesday Book (1086); the manor had four hides of land and land for thirty ploughs. The lord had land for three ploughs with eleven serfs. Twenty-four villeins and fourteen smallholders had land for fifteen ploughs. There were also one and a half square leagues of pasture and a small amount of woodland. The income of the manor was £6 sterling.

In 1601 Robert Rolle (died 1633) purchased the manor of Callington, thereby gaining the pocket borough seat of Callington in Parliament, which in future served to promote the careers of many Rolles. He nominated to this seat his brother William Rolle (died 1652) in 1604 and 1614, his son Sir Henry Rolle (1589–1656), of Shapwick, in 1620 and 1624, his son-in-law Thomas Wise (died March 1641) of Sydenham in Devon, in 1625, and another son John Rolle (1598–1648), 
  
In the 19th century, Callington was one of the most important mining areas in Great Britain. Deposits of silver were found nearby in Silver Valley. Today, the area is marked by mining remains, but there are no active mines. Granite is still quarried on Hingston Down.

The former Callington constituency, a rotten borough, elected two members to the unreformed House of Commons but was abolished by the Reform Act 1832. The town is now in the South East Cornwall constituency.

St Mary's Church was originally a chapel of ease to South Hill; it was consecrated in 1438 and then had two aisles and a buttressed tower; a second north aisle was added in 1882. Unusually for Cornwall there is a clerestory; the wagon roofs are old. The parish church contains the fine brass of Nicholas Assheton and his wife, 1466.

In the churchyard there is a Gothic lantern cross. It was first mentioned by the historian William Borlase in 1752. Each of the four faces of the cross head features a carved figure beneath an ogee arch. The heads of these figures have been chiselled off, no doubt in the Commonwealth period.

Governance
Callington is one of a small number of towns to continue to appoint a Portreeve; originally a medieval revenue officer and now an honorary title given to the chairman of the town council. Callington Town Council has twelve members and covers the civil parish of Callington. At the Council elections in 2013 only ten candidates stood, eight Independents and two Mebyon Kernow Councillors. The current  portreeve of the town is Mike Tagg.

Development
In recent years, the town has seen much residential development with more, including social housing, planned for the next few years. The neighbouring village of Kelly Bray has almost doubled in size in recent years with houses still being built in the area. A housing estate named Meadowbrook is in the process of being built.

Twinning
Callington is twinned with Guipavas in Brittany, France, and Barsbüttel near Hamburg in Germany.  It also has unofficial friendship links with Keila in Estonia and a suburb of Málaga, Spain.

Sport
Callington has both football and cricket teams. Callington Town Football Club (established 1989) has four adult teams playing in the South West Peninsula League, East Cornwall League, Duchy League and South West Regional Women's Football League. They all play at Marshfield Parc, which backs onto Callington Community College. Callington Cricket Club has three teams playing in the Cornwall Cricket League and play their games at Moores Park. Callington Badminton Club plays on a Friday from 1900hrs till 2200hrs at the Community College sports hall. They play in the Plymouth & District league and run two men's teams, a Ladies team and a mixed/medley team. The club is open to all ages and abilities so everyone is welcome. Callington Bowling Club (established 1946) is based at Chantry Park, off the Liskeard Road. The club has men's teams playing in the Cornwall League, East Cornwall League, and the Plymouth and District League. Ladies teams play in Rippon, Date, and Tamar Leagues. The club also run 3 mixed shortmat teams during the winter months.

See also

 People from Callington
 Dupath Well
 East Cornwall Mineral Railway
 Callington Community College

References

External links
 Callington Town Council website
 Online Catalogue for Callington at the Cornwall Record Office
 

 
Towns in Cornwall
Market towns in Cornwall
Civil parishes in Cornwall